Tiangongyuan station is a station on and the southern terminus of the  of the Beijing Subway. The station is located at the intersection of Xinyuan Street and Simiao Road.

Station layout 
The station has an underground island platform.

Exits
There are four exits, lettered A, B, C, and D. Exit D is accessible.

References

External links

Beijing Subway stations in Daxing District
Railway stations in China opened in 2010